Salpinginae is a subfamily of narrow-waisted bark beetles in the family Salpingidae.

Genera
 Austrosalpingus Blair, 1925
 Colposis Mulsant, 1859
 Oncosalpingus Blair, 1919
 Platamops Reitter, 1878
 Poophylax Champion, 1916
 Rabocerus Mulsant, 1859
 Rhinosimus Latreille, 1805 i c g b
 Salpingoides Nikitsky 1988
 Salpingus Gyllenhal, 1810
 Sphaeriestes Stephens, 1831 i c g b
 Trichocolposinus Seidlitz, 1916
 Vincenzellus Reitter, 1911 i c g b
Data sources: i = ITIS, c = Catalogue of Life, g = GBIF, b = Bugguide.net

References

Further reading

External links

 

Salpingidae
Articles created by Qbugbot